The 2012 Howard Bison football team represented Howard University in the 2012 NCAA Division I FCS football season. They were led by second year head coach Gary Harrell and played their home games at William H. Greene Stadium. They are a member of the Mid-Eastern Athletic Conference. They finished the season 7–4, 6–2 in MEAC play to finish in second place.

Schedule

Source: Schedule

References

Howard
Howard Bison football seasons
Howard Bison football